Forensic Science International is a peer-reviewed academic journal of forensic science. The journal was established in 1972 and is published by Elsevier.  The journal occasionally published supplements from 1999 onwards, but these supplements were spun into their own journal Forensic Science International Supplement Series in 2009. Only one issue of the supplement series was published under its distinct title.

Abstracting and Indexing
Forensic Science International is abstracted and indexed in the following databases:

See also
Forensic Science International: Genetics

External links
Forensic Science International
Forensic Science International Supplement Series
Forensic Science International @ Elsevier
Forensic Science International Supplement Series @ Elsevier

Monthly journals
Elsevier academic journals
English-language journals
Criminology journals
Publications established in 1972
Forensic science journals